The Cueva Murciélago Wildlife Refuge is a wildlife refuge of Costa Rica, part of the Tempisque Conservation Area, and protects tropical forest in the coastal areas of the southern Nicoya Peninsula near Cabuya.

References

External links
Cueva Murcielago Wildlife Refuge at Costa Rica National Parks

Nature reserves in Costa Rica
Geography of Puntarenas Province